The 2002 season of the astronomy TV show Jack Horkheimer: Star Gazer starring Jack Horkheimer started on December 31, 2001. The show's episode numbering scheme changed several times during its run to coincide with major events in the show's history. The official Star Gazer website hosts the complete scripts for each of the shows.


2002 season

References

External links 
  Star Gazer official website
 

Jack Horkheimer: Star Gazer
2002 American television seasons